List of Colonial Heads of the Dutch fort at Delagoa Bay (now Maputo Bay, in Mozambique):

{|
Term
Incumbent
Notes
|-
|valign=top|March 1721||colspan="3"|Dutch East India Company - Dutch Fort Lijdzaamheid (archaic spelling Leydsaemheyt) at Delagoa Bay purchased from king Maphumbo under Dutch Cape Colony
|-
|rowspan="2"|April 1722 to 28 August 1722||Pirate occupation led by
|-
|John Taylor
|-
|Opperhoofden  (Chief factors)
|-
|March 1721 to May 1721||Willem van Taak, Opperhoofd
|-
|May 1721 to 1722||Casparus Swertner, Opperhoofd
|-
|1722 to May 1724||Jean Michel, Opperhoofd
|-
|June 1724 to 1726||Jan van de Capelle, Opperhoofd||1st Term
|-
|1726 to 8 January 1727||Jan de Koning, Opperhoofd
|-
|8 January 1727 to 27 December 1730||Jan van de Capelle, Opperhoofd||2nd Term; 18 March 1729: VOC decision to close the post
|-
|27 December 1730||Settlement abandoned; territory became part of Portuguese East Africa
|}

Dutch colonial governors and administrators
History of Mozambique
Dutch Empire-related lists
Lists of Dutch colonial governors and administrators